Reports of Cases in the Court of King's Bench, together with some other cases from T. T. 12 Geo. I., to T. T. 7 Geo. II., from 1726 - 31 is the title of a collection of nominate reports, by Thomas Barnardiston, of cases decided by the Court of King's Bench between approximately 1726 and 1735. For the purpose of citation, their name may be abbreviated to "Barn KB". They are in two volumes. They are reprinted in volume 94 of the English Reports.

J. G. Marvin said:

References
Reports of Cases in the Court of King's Bench, together with some other cases from T. T. 12 Geo. I., to T. T. 7 Geo. II., from 1726 - 31. 2 vols. folio. London. 1744.

Sets of reports reprinted in the English Reports
Court of King's Bench (England)